Kenneth Eric Church (born May 3, 1977) is an American country music singer-songwriter. He has released nine studio albums through Capitol Nashville since 2005. His debut album, 2006's Sinners Like Me, produced three singles on the Billboard country charts including the top 20 hits "How 'Bout You", "Two Pink Lines", and "Guys Like Me".

His second album, 2009's Carolina, produced three more singles: "Smoke a Little Smoke" and his first top 10 hits, "Love Your Love the Most" and "Hell on the Heart". 2011's Chief, his first No. 1 album, gave him his first two No. 1 singles, "Drink in My Hand" and "Springsteen", and the hits "Homeboy", "Creepin'", and "Like Jesus Does". His third No. 1 single was "The Only Way I Know", which he, Jason Aldean, and Luke Bryan recorded for Aldean's album Night Train.

A fourth album, The Outsiders, was released in February 2014. It produced five new singles between 2013 and 2015 with the title track, "Give Me Back My Hometown", "Cold One", "Talladega" and "Like a Wrecking Ball". "Talladega" and "Give Me Back My Hometown" each reached number one on the Country Airplay chart. Eric Church got his sixth No. 1 hit with Keith Urban in May 2015 with the single "Raise 'Em Up". His fifth studio album, Mr. Misunderstood, was released in November 2015 and went on to produce two number one singles with "Record Year" and "Round Here Buzz". On July 13, 2018, Church released the first single and title track of his album Desperate Man, which was released in October 2018. In April 2021, Church released the triple album set Heart & Soul.

Early life
Church was born on May 3, 1977, in Granite Falls, North Carolina (Dudley Shoals area), to Ken and Rita Church. Church worked with his father at Clayton Marcus, a furniture upholstery company where his father was president. At 13, he bought a guitar and began writing songs of his own. By his senior year of high school, he had found a gig at a local bar, which occupied most of his time. He played many Jimmy Buffett cover songs and a few of his own original songs in some dive bars. Some of these places were so rough that he got into a few altercations from the stage. For a few years, the band played often in bars and restaurants throughout North Carolina. The band "Mountain Boys" consisted of his college roommate, brother, and a fellow guitarist.

Before moving to Nashville, Eric graduated from South Caldwell High School and then Appalachian State University with a degree in marketing. Upon graduation, Church became engaged to a Spanish teacher in the town of Lenoir, North Carolina. The future bride's father attempted to persuade Church into a corporate career, which he rejected as an aspiring musician (and later referenced in his song "What I Almost Was" from his debut album). She broke the engagement and he headed to Nashville with his father's financial backing. His father also provided the opportunity to make contacts, and more importantly, time to focus on developing his songwriting ability.

Music career

2006–2007: Sinners Like Me
Church co-wrote Terri Clark's 2005 single "The World Needs a Drink", and the track "Whiskey Wings" on Dean Miller's 2005 album Platinum.

He started recording with different producers. Capitol Nashville showed an interest and watched him perform but they were yet to be convinced enough to offer a recording contract. Autumn House-Tallant told HitQuarters that they did not think his music was "interesting" enough. The record company's attitude changed after he started working with producer Jay Joyce. Doyle states, "Eric scored a meeting with Nashville heavyweight Arthur Buenahora, a publisher at Sony Music who also signed Taylor Swift and Miranda Lambert. Church played him "Lightning", a ballad he wrote after watching the movie The Green Mile". (p. 5) The strong sound and direction the two forged together finally convinced Capitol Nashville that he was ready. His first single, "How 'Bout You" peaked at No. 14 on Hot Country Songs and led off his debut album Sinners Like Me. In April 2006, he performed on the Grand Ole Opry for the first time.

The album's other two singles, "Two Pink Lines" and "Guys Like Me", both reached the Top 20 as well. The fourth single, the title track, peaked at No. 51. An additional track from the album, "Lightning", was made into a music video despite not being released as a single. Church wrote the song shortly after moving to Nashville, inspired by the movie The Green Mile. Following the album's success, Church toured with Brad Paisley and Rascal Flatts. Church was fired from opening for Rascal Flatts after repeatedly performing for longer than his allotted time, despite repeated warnings. He was replaced by Taylor Swift, who was just starting her career. Before Swift started the tour, Church and Swift spoke, where he told Swift that she would thrive on the tour and joked that she should give him her first gold record as a thanks. Swift later did give him her first gold record with an attached note that said "Thanks for playing too long and too loud on the Flatts tour. I sincerely appreciate it. Taylor".

2008–2010: Carolina
In 2008, Church released a fifth single, "His Kind of Money (My Kind of Love)" to country radio. It debuted on the Billboard Hot Country Songs chart at No. 55 in early 2008, and reached its peak of No. 46 in August. Originally slated as the lead single to an upcoming second album, "His Kind of Money" was instead included as a bonus track on albums sold at Best Buy.

Following this song was "Love Your Love the Most", which debuted in early 2009 and was the first single from his second album Carolina, released in stores on March 24, 2009. The night before the official release, Church and Capitol Records distributed copies of the album on the campus of Church's alma mater, Appalachian State University, during a "release party" concert. As with his debut album, Carolina was produced by Jay Joyce, and is entirely composed of songs that he co-wrote. "Love Your Love the Most" brought Church to the top 10 for the very first time, peaking at No. 10 in September 2009. The album's second single, "Hell on the Heart", debuted in October 2009 and would also hit the top 10 in May 2010. The third single from "Carolina" was "Smoke a Little Smoke".

In June 2010, Church moved to Capitol Nashville's new imprint EMI Records Nashville, becoming their second artist. On January 14, 2011, he released a four-song EP entitled Caldwell County.

2011–2013: Chief

Church released "Homeboy" to country radio in early 2011. The album Chief, produced by Jay Joyce, was released July 26, 2011, debuting at No. 1 on both Top Country Albums and the Billboard 200. The album sold 145,000 copies in its first week. On November 30, 2011, Chief was announced as a nominee for the 2012 Grammy Awards for Best Country Album. In January 2012 "Drink in My Hand" became his first No. 1 single. In February 2012, "Springsteen" was released as the third single from Chief. In an interview with American Songwriter, Church stated that the song was about "a love affair that takes place in an amphitheater between two people. It didn't happen with Springsteen, ironically, it happened with another artist." The song went on to become a No. 1 country hit, as well as his first Top 20 single on the Billboard Hot 100. The album's fourth single, "Creepin'", was released to country radio on July 16, 2012. Church lent his vocals for a song titled, "The Only Way I Know", with Jason Aldean along Luke Bryan. This song appears on Aldean's album Night Train, from which it was released as the second single. The fifth single from Chief, "Like Jesus Does", was released in January 2013 and peaked at number six on Country Airplay chart in June 2013.

In September 2012, Church announced that he planned to release his first live album in 2013, containing recordings of performances at the Tivoli Theatre in Chattanooga, Tennessee, on October 8 and 9, 2012. On February 8, the live album's title was announced as Caught in the Act, with a release date set for April 9.  Church has stated he plans to take some time off from music in 2013 to focus on his songwriting and musical direction. At the 2012 CMA Awards in November, Church's album Chief won Album of the Year. In November it was announced that Church would co-headline Kenny Chesney's No Shoes Nation Tour alongside Chesney, Zac Brown Band, and Eli Young Band. In December, Eric was honored as one of the CMT Artists of the Year Awards. His award was presented by Kid Rock and he received a video message of congratulations from Metallica's James Hetfield.

2013–2015: The Outsiders
On October 22, 2013, Church released a new single titled "The Outsiders". His fourth studio album, also titled The Outsiders, was released on February 11, 2014. This album, as with Church's previous three, was produced by Jay Joyce and released on the EMI Records Nashville label. It was followed in January 2014 by "Give Me Back My Hometown". This single reached number one on the Country Airplay chart, becoming his fourth overall. The third single, "Cold One", was released in June 2014, followed by "Talladega" in September. The latter reached number one on the Country Airplay chart in February 2015. The fifth single, "Like a Wrecking Ball", was released to country radio on March 9, 2015.

2015–2018: Mr. Misunderstood
On November 3, 2015, Church's new surprise album, Mr. Misunderstood, arrived in the mailboxes of his fan club members. The album became available to the public on iTunes the following day. The album was released as a surprise with no fanfare and no promotional advertisements. It was produced by Jay Joyce and executive producer Arturo Buenahora, Jr. The first single, the title track, was released to radio on November 9, 2015. The first live performance and debut of the track was at the 2015 CMA Awards. The song peaked at No. 15 on the airplay chart on February 6, 2016. "Record Year" is the album's second single. The album's final track, "Three Year Old", pays tribute to all the lessons Church has learned from his three-year-old son, who was also credited with naming Church's guitar "ButterBean". Church used "ButterBean" for the creation of the album. Mr. Misunderstood was nominated for Album of the Year at the 2016 ACM Awards and the title track was nominated for Video of the Year. Mr. Misunderstood features ten self-written and co-written tracks and features themes of independence, lessons learned, and loyalty. The album was recorded by Jason Hall at St. Charles in Nashville. In March 2016, "Record Year" was released to radio; it reached No. 1 on the Country Airplay in August 2016. The album's third single, "Kill a Word" released to country radio on August 29, 2016. Church was selected as one of 30 artists to perform on "Forever Country", a mash-up track of "Take Me Home, Country Roads", "On the Road Again" and "I Will Always Love You" which celebrates 50 years of the CMA Awards.

Church played his biggest solo tour to date with his Holdin' My Own Tour that featured 62 shows in 61 cities from January through May 2017. The tour was capped off by two sold-out shows at Nashville's Bridgestone Arena, with the Friday night show breaking the arena's capacity record before being one-upped by the Saturday night show which set of record of 19,020 attendees.

On October 4, 2017, Church debuted a song he had written for Sonny Melton, who died in the Las Vegas shooting tragedy. The song, called "Why Not Me", was performed at the Grand Ole Opry in Nashville.

In November 2017 Church released a limited run vinyl box set titled 61 Days in Church that would be released in monthly stages through 2018. The collection includes 124 tracks all of which were recorded live at the 61 shows of his 2017 Holdin' My Own Tour. The set includes two songs from each concert of the tour with the exception of the final two Nashville shows, which feature three songs from each night. He had already began releasing the album in stages for free on digital streaming services in September 2017.

2018–2021: Desperate Man
On July 12, 2018, Church announced via social media that he would release his sixth album, Desperate Man, on October 5, 2018. He released the album's first single and title track the following day.

On November 11, 2020, Church won the Entertainer of the Year award at the 54th Annual Country Music Association Awards.

He performed "The Star-Spangled Banner" alongside Jazmine Sullivan at Super Bowl LV.

2021-present: Heart & Soul
On April 16, 2021, Church released the album Heart, followed by the album &, on April 20, and Soul, on April 23. The triple-album release contains 24 songs in total, including the singles Heart On Fire and "Hell of a View".

In October 2021, after two of his bandmates tested positive for COVID-19, Church performed two solo concerts on his The Gather Again Tour. The solo shows were in Pittsburgh on October 8 and Philadelphia on October 9. On February 22, 2022, Church was announced to perform at the 57th Academy of Country Music Awards on March 7, 2022.

Personal life
On January 8, 2008, Church married music publisher Katherine Blasingame at West Glow Resort in Blowing Rock, North Carolina. At the wedding, Church performed "You Make It Look So Easy", a song he wrote for Blasingame. On October 3, 2011, their first son, Boone McCoy Church, was born; he is the subject of Church's song "Three Year Old". On February 15, 2015, their second son, Tennessee Hawkins "Hawk" Church was born. Their home (along with Church's "man cave"), located in Nashville, was featured in an episode of CMT's Cribs.

The Chief Cares Fund is a foundation organized by Eric and Katherine Church in 2013. The non-profit organization has been used to help underprivileged families in Tennessee, North Carolina, and even as far as helping orphans in Nepal receive clothing, proper bedding, and schooling. The foundation has also delivered Bibles to Haiti and helps fund Humane Society no-kill animal shelters. People can donate to the foundation on Eric Church's website by simply donating or by purchasing exclusive Chief Cares Platinum Tickets to his concerts where money from the tickets go to the Chief Cares Fund.

In November 2022, North Carolina Governor Roy Cooper awarded Church the North Carolina Award, the state's highest civilian honor.

Church wears his signature aviator sunglasses as a result of wearing contact lenses. When his career was getting started, he was forced to deal with the heat from the stage lights drying out his contacts. As he began performing in larger venues, his aviators and Von Dutch denim trucker hat became his trademark.

Church has become an avid advocate for the use of cannabis, reflected in songs such as "Smoke a Little Smoke"; at the time of that song's release, Church's record label urged him not to release the song, though it had minor success as a single. Church has also referenced marijuana use in other songs like "The Joint" and "I'm Gettin' Stoned", and has even been the subject of a marijuana joke at the 49th ACM Awards where Blake Shelton and Luke Bryan referred to Eric Church as the Willie Nelson for the new-country generation and compared Eric Church's dressing room to a cannabis dispensary.

Controversy
In March 2022, Church was heavily criticized by fans for cancelling a then-upcoming April concert in San Antonio, Texas in order to watch the North Carolina Tar Heels play Duke in the NCAA Championship Final Four. In response to the criticism, Church announced a makeup concert in New Braunfels, Texas, for the date of September 2, and justified the cancellation in a follow-up interview stating, in part, "To win that, it was a wild week or two. It was just something I had to be there, and had to take my boys ... I can’t recreate Duke and Carolina Final Four."

Musical styles
Church's style has been described as country rock, outlaw country, and southern rock. Church's influences include Hank Williams Jr., Merle Haggard, Little Feat, The Band, Kris Kristofferson, The Grateful Dead, Ray Wylie Hubbard and Waylon Jennings. Church has also said that many hard rock and heavy metal bands influenced his music, including Metallica, Pantera, and AC/DC.

Discography

Studio albums
 Sinners Like Me (2006)
 Carolina (2009)
 Chief (2011)
 The Outsiders (2014)
 Mr. Misunderstood (2015)
 Desperate Man (2018)
 Heart & Soul (2021)

Tours
Headlining
 Jägermeister Country Tour (2010)
 Blood, Sweat and Beers Tour (2012–13)
 The Outsiders World Tour (2014–15)
 Holdin' My Own Tour (2017)
 Double Down Tour (2019)
 Gather Again Tour (2021–22)
 Outsiders Revival Tour (2023)

Supporting
 Me and My Gang Tour (2006) with Rascal Flatts
 Rowdy Friends Tours (2010) with Hank Williams Jr
 CMT Revolution Tour (2010) with Miranda Lambert
 Roadside Bars and Pink Guitars (2010) with Miranda Lambert
 My Kinda Party Tour (2011) with Jason Aldean
 Locked and Loaded Tour (2011) with Toby Keith
 No Shoes Nation Tour (2013) with Kenny Chesney
 Locked and Reloaded Tour (2013) with Dierks Bentley and Miranda Lambert

Band members
Band members
 Eric Church – lead vocals, rhythm guitar, acoustic guitar, banjo, piano
 Driver Williams – lead guitar, rhythm guitar
 Jeff Cease – rhythm guitar, lead guitar
 Jeff Hyde – acoustic guitar, banjo, background vocals
 Lee Hendricks – bass guitar
 Craig Wright – drums
 Jay Joyce – production

Former members
Joanna Cotten - vocals (2013-2022)

Awards and nominations

References

External links
 Official website

1977 births
American country singer-songwriters
American country guitarists
American male guitarists
American country banjoists
American male singer-songwriters
American Southern Rock musicians
Appalachian State University alumni
Capitol Records artists
Country musicians from North Carolina
EMI Records artists
Living people
People from Granite Falls, North Carolina
Rock banjoists
Singer-songwriters from North Carolina
Guitarists from North Carolina
21st-century American singers
21st-century American guitarists
21st-century American male singers